Peter Francis Harnetty, (June 6, 1927, Brighton, England), is professor emeritus of Asian Studies at the University of British Columbia.

Personal 
Harnetty was born June 6, 1927, in Brighton, England, to Edward and Anne (McKeon) Harnetty. He traveled from the UK to Canada to attend the University of British Columbia . In September 1956, he married Claire Demers. They have one son., Harnetty made an endowment for a grant called the Peter Harnetty Prize in Asian Studies that is awarded annually to undergraduate students.

Non-teaching activities

Military service 
Harnetty served in the British Army and British Indian Army from August 17, 1944 to January 13, 1949. His service included:
The Queen’s Royal Regiment in England (1944–45). 
The 4/6 Rajputana Rifles in India (1945–46) 
He also served in Burma.
He was transferred to the Royal Sussex Regiment while retaining his Lieutenancy and seniority on April 1, 1947.
Later he was part of the Parachute Regiment (United Kingdom) in England, Palestine, and Germany.

Education 
Harnetty received a Bachelor of Arts degree in History at the University of British Columbia from 1949 to 1953 followed by a Masters of Arts (1954) and a Doctorate (1958) at Harvard University. Harnetty undertook post-doctoral research studies starting in the summer of 1964 at the India Office Library in London and the Manchester Central Reference Library after receiving a research fellowship from the Canada Council.

Politics 
Harnetty was one of over 500 academics to sign a petition in 2015 in support of Fair Vote Canada.

Professional

Teaching 
Harnetty was hired as an instructor at the University of British Columbia in 1958. From 1958 to 1992, Harnetty held a joint appointment in the UBC Department of Asian Studies and the UBC Department of History. In fact, "the University inaugurated the teaching of South Asian courses with recruitment of [Harnetty]." In 1971, he was promoted to full professor. He served first as acting head of the Dept. of Asian Studies in 1970/71 and then as head 1975-1980. Upon his retirement in 1992, he was granted the status of Professor Emeritus.

Profesional Committees 
Shastri Indo-Canadian Institute, President/Resident Director 1970–71.
 South Asia Regional Council of the Association for Asian Studies – Elected Member, 1973–76.
Canadian Historical Association Committee on Graduate Studies, 1972–76.

Affiliations and memberships 
 Elected in 1988 to be a Fellow of the Royal Historical Society.

Professional awards 
 Woodrow Wilson National Fellowship Foundation fellow, 1953-54.
 Social Science Research Council fellow, 1956-57.
 Nuffield Foundation fellow, 1964-65.
 Canada Council senior fellow, 1964–65, 1971-72.
 Faculty of Arts Teaching Prize (now UBC Killam Teaching Prize), 1990.

Publications 
 HARNETTY, Peter. Imperialism and Free Trade. Lancashire and India in the Mid-Nineteenth Century. [Vancouver]: University of British Columbia; Manchester: Manchester University Press, 1973.

Archival records 

The records pertaining to Harnetty’s time as a professor at the University of British Columbia are located in the University of British Columbia Archives.

References 

Academic staff of the University of British Columbia
University of British Columbia alumni
Harvard University alumni